Jolene Purdy is an American actress. Purdy starred as Cherita Chen in the 2001 film Donnie Darko. Among her television credits is the Fox sitcom Do Not Disturb, which debuted in 2008, as well as the ABC Family comedy series 10 Things I Hate About You, playing Mandella in eight episodes. Purdy has also guest starred on Judging Amy and Boston Public. Purdy is also known for her role as Piper Katins on the TeenNick drama series Gigantic. She had a recurring role in the Netflix drama series Orange Is The New Black as well as Marvel's WandaVision.

Early life
Her mother is Japanese American and her father is White and Jewish. She is Yonsei, a great-grandchild of Japanese immigrants. She has sisters. She and her husband, Chuck, have a daughter.

As of 2017, she resides in Southern California.

Filmography

See also
 History of the Japanese in Los Angeles

References

External links

21st-century American actresses
Actresses from California
American film actresses
Living people
American actresses of Japanese descent
American film actors of Asian descent
American people of Jewish descent
American television actresses
Year of birth missing (living people)